The Municipality of Postojna is a municipality in the traditional region  of Inner Carniola in southwestern Slovenia. The seat of the municipality is the town of Postojna. The municipality was established in its current form on 3 October 1994, when the former larger Municipality of Postojna was subdivided into the municipalities of Pivka and Postojna.

Settlements
In addition to the municipal seat of Postojna, the municipality also includes the following settlements:

 Belsko
 Brezje pod Nanosom
 Bukovje
 Dilce
 Gorenje
 Goriče
 Grobišče
 Hrašče
 Hrenovice
 Hruševje
 Koče
 Landol
 Liplje
 Lohača
 Mala Brda
 Mali Otok
 Malo Ubeljsko
 Matenja Vas
 Orehek
 Planina
 Predjama
 Prestranek
 Rakitnik
 Rakulik
 Razdrto
 Sajevče
 Slavina
 Slavinje
 Šmihel pod Nanosom
 Stara Vas
 Strane
 Strmca
 Studenec
 Studeno
 Velika Brda
 Veliki Otok
 Veliko Ubeljsko
 Zagon
 Žeje

Attractions
The entire municipality has a typical karst landscape. One of Slovenia's major tourist attractions, Postojna Cave, is located in the municipality.

References

External links
 
Municipality of Postojna on Geopedia
Municipality of Postojna website

 
1994 establishments in Slovenia
Postojna